Crocus baytopiorum  is a species of flowering plant in the genus Crocus of the family Iridaceae. It is a cormous perennial native to Turkey.

Description
Crocus baytopiorum is a spring flowering herbaceous perennial geophyte growing from a corm. The  13 cm wide corm is a flatted egg shape. The tunic around the corm has thick fibers and is coarsely netted. A spathe (sheath that covers the flower before it opens) subtends the inflorescence. The pale blue flowers are distinctive. The arillate seeds are red with a pointed end.

Habitat
Crocus baytopiorum is native to limestone screes, rocky gullies, in open pine and juniper woodland. Flowering occurs in February.

The species was named in honor of Professors Turhan & Asuman Baytop from Istanbul,  who discovered it in 1973 and it was described by the Kew botanist Brian Mathew.

References

baytopiorum
Flora of Turkey